Patrick Robert Chovanec (born February 14, 1970) is an American chief strategist at Silvercrest Asset Management, and an adjunct professor at the School of International and Public Affairs, Columbia University. A former professor at Tsinghua University's School of Business and Management in Beijing, China, and a former political aide to senior Republican Party leaders in the U.S., he is a frequent commentator on the Chinese and global economies. His blog was named by the Wall Street Journal as one of "The Best Economics Blogs" for 2010. In 2014, Business Insider named him one of "The 102 Finance People You Have To Follow On Twitter".

Biography

Early life and education 
Patrick Chovanec was born on February 14, 1970, in LaGrange, Illinois, and was raised in nearby Western Springs, Illinois, in the western suburbs of Chicago. He attended high school at St. Ignatius College Prep, in Chicago, and upon graduating in 1988 was one of 141 young Americans invited to the White House and recognized by President Ronald Reagan as a Presidential Scholar. His first visit to China took place in 1986, and during college he travelled extensively across East Asia, Central Asia, and the Indian Subcontinent, including a brief period working as a volunteer at Mother Teresa's Kalighat Home for the Dying in Calcutta, India. He graduated with an A.B. in economics from Princeton University in 1993 after completing an 108-page-long senior thesis, titled "Modelling the Informal Economy: The Case of Mexico City", under the supervision of Christina Paxson. He then received an M.B.A. in Finance and Accounting (2005) from The Wharton School at the University of Pennsylvania, where he graduated as a Palmer Scholar in the top 5% of his class. After receiving an ROTC scholarship at Princeton, he served nine years as a transportation and logistics officer in the United States Army Reserve.

Career 
Upon graduating college, Chovanec worked as a policy aide to Republican strategist William Kristol at Project for the Republican Future. The Project's fax memos to Republican leaders, to which Chovanec contributed, were widely credited with orchestrating the political defeat of the Clinton health care plan in 1993. After the so-called Republican Revolution of 1994, when the Republican Party gained majority control of Congress, Chovanec worked for current Speaker of the House John Boehner, then chairman of the House Republican Conference. As the editor of Legislative Digest, Chovanec was in charge of internal communication and legislative analysis for all House Republicans, and played a central role in coordinating passage of the Contract with America. Chovanec directly reported to Barry Jackson, who went on to serve in the White House as chief deputy to Karl Rove, and later replaced Rove as President George W. Bush's top political advisor.

In 2000, Chovanec was hired by Institutional Investor to serve as director of their Asia-Pacific Institute, based in Hong Kong, a private forum for senior heads of financial institutions. He later ran a similar forum, the Global Fixed Income Institute, based in London, for senior European bond investors. After earning his MBA, Chovanec returned to Asia to work as a private equity investor for a series of funds focused mainly on China.

From 2008 to 2013, Chovanec taught as an Associate Professor of Practice at Tsinghua University's School of Economics and Management, located in Beijing, China, in the school's English-language International MBA program.  He taught courses on US-China business relations, the market and regulatory environment for foreign companies in the U.S., and American business history. Outside the classroom, Chovanec served as a private advisor to several Fortune 500 corporations, hedge funds, private equity funds, and foreign governments regarding China. He also chaired the Public Policy Development Committee for the American Chamber of Commerce in China (Amcham China), where he helped coordinate annual publication of the American business community's public policy White Paper on China, as well as its annual Business Climate Survey.

In March 2013, Chovanec joined Silvercrest Asset Management Group as managing director and chief strategist. Silvercrest Asset Management oversees $18.6 billion in investments on behalf of wealthy families and select institutions. He also teaches as an adjunct professor at the School of International and Public Affairs, Columbia University.

Chovanec is a frequent commentator in both the international and Chinese media. His insights into Chinese economics, business, politics, and culture have been featured on CNN, BBC, PBS, NPR, CBS, ABC, CNBC, Voice of America, and Bloomberg, as well as in Time, Newsweek, Wall Street Journal, Financial Times, The Economist, BusinessWeek, Foreign Affairs, Foreign Policy, The Atlantic, New York Times, Washington Post, The Guardian, La Tribune, Christian Science Monitor, Chicago Tribune, Los Angeles Times, O Estado de S. Paulo, and Motley Fool. He is a regular contributor to Forbes, China Economic Review, CCTV News, China Radio International, Al-Jazeera, and Seeking Alpha.

He has guest-lectured at Harvard University, the MIT Sloan School of Management, The Wharton School, Johns Hopkins SAIS, and the United States Military Academy at West Point, and has spoken at the Council on Foreign Relations, the Chicago Council on Global Affairs, the Woodrow Wilson International Center for Scholars, and China's Central Party School. He is also a senior fellow with the Goldwater Institute, a conservative public policy think tank based in Arizona and serves on the Dean's International Council for the University of Chicago's Harris School of Public Policy Studies.

Chovanec is a Certified Public Accountant (CPA) registered in the State of Illinois.

Writings and commentary

China's real estate market 
Chovanec was among the early commentators to highlight the threat of a bubble forming in China's real estate market in the wake of the global financial crisis. In an article in the June 2009 issue of Far Eastern Economic Review, he introduced the idea that Chinese savers have been stockpiling multiple residential units, and willingly leaving them vacant, as a "store of value," like gold. He identified three main reasons for this behavior: (1) the lack of attractive investment alternatives, given China's closed capital account, (2) a limited track record, given that China had never seen a sustained downturn in real estate since converting to private home ownership in the 1990s, and (3) minimal holding costs, in particular the absence of an annual property holding tax. Chovanec argues that, despite strong housing demand from rising incomes and urbanization in China, these factors have distorted the market and created a persistent but ultimately unsustainable overhang in high-end housing. He further argues that China's state-inspired lending boom, in response to the global financial crisis, has created a more classic leveraged bubble in commercial real estate. Chovanec contends that while the systemic risk may look substantially different from the conditions that spawned the U.S. subprime mortgage crisis, Chinese banks nevertheless have significant exposure to the property market, due to the widespread practice of lending to businesses on the basis of inflated land values as collateral. In late 2011, in Foreign Affairs magazine, Chovanec called attention to the downturn in China property prices and transaction volumes, suggesting that the "bubble" may have popped. He has since argued that lifting the central government's restrictions on multiple home purchases, along with a renewed push to construct subsidized public housing, would not—as is commonly hoped—be sufficient to turn the market around in the face of what Chovanec sees as a more fundamental correction.

China's post-crisis economic stimulus 
Chovanec has been consistently critical of China's stimulus package in response to the global financial crisis, although he admits that China's leaders may have felt they had little alternative at the onset of the crisis. He has stated that the challenge China faces is not quantity of GDP, but quality of GDP (economic investments that would position China for sustainable future growth), and has questioned the economic utility of many of the state-led projects designed to boost China's near-term GDP to achieve the government's target of 8%. Beginning in May 2009, he wrote that the ongoing lending boom by Chinese state-run banks could burden them with sizeable bad debt, as well as reverse a decade's worth of reforms intended to transform those banks into genuine commercial entities. He also contends that the lending boom, by expanding China's money supply more than 50% over the past two years, has created massive inflationary pressure in the Chinese economy, despite low reported increases in CPI. Chovanec reconciles the apparent discrepancy by arguing that China's monetary expansion has been channeled into asset inflation, including real estate, gold, jade, and other tangible forms of savings, and is only gradually working its way into more general price inflation. He argues that, unless China's economy is quickly weaned from its dependence on "easy credit and cheap money," rising inflation will force Chinese authorities to cut off liquidity, causing a hard landing.

Chovanec has been equally critical of China's growing tendency, in the wake of the crisis, to favor active state intervention and state-owned enterprises at the expense of continued market opening and private enterprise—a trend summed up in the Chinese expression "guo jin min tui" (国进民退), or "the state advances, the private sector retreats." In October 2010, Chovanec wrote that China's leaders need to stage an encore of Deng Xiaoping's 1992 Southern Tour, in order to recommit the country to the path of market reform, after a similar period of retrenchment.

China's currency and exchange rate regime 
Chovanec argues that it is in China's own interests to move towards a more flexible exchange rate and a stronger Renminbi. Such a move, he believes, would reduce inflationary pressures on China's economy and enhance the buying power, and hence the living standards, of average Chinese citizens, as well as reducing tensions with China's trading partners. However, he sharply disagrees with Paul Krugman, and argues that an exclusive focus on rectifying exchange rates as a "silver bullet" is misplaced. Forcing China to strengthen its currency against its will, he contends, would only cause China to shore up its export sector through other means, and would likely result in a replay of the 1985 Plaza Accord (in which the value of the Japanese yen doubled, yet had virtually no impact on the US-Japan trade imbalance due to structural reasons). Exchange rate reform, Chovanec believes, will only have the desired impact if it is part of a broader economic strategy in which China embraces greater market reform and opening.

The Nine Nations of China 
In November 2009, Chovanec authored an interactive map-based article in the online version of The Atlantic, titled "The Nine Nations of China", in which he wrote the China can be considered not as a monolithic entity of 1.3 billion people, but as a mosaic of nine distinct regions, each with its own history, character, and dynamics shaping its future. He pointed out that, if each of these regions were actually a separate country, they would account for eight of the 20 most populous nations in the world. Chovanec says his framework was largely inspired by Joel Garreau's 1981 book The Nine Nations of North America. Chovanec noted that while he later became aware that several previous scholars, such as G. William Skinner, had proposed similar regional breakdowns of China, his own "Nine Nations" framework and the regional descriptions that support it are original, based on his private equity investment experiences in China and his travels to every one of China's 31 provinces over the past 25 years. Chovanec has proposed that the "Nine Nations" could provide a valuable framework for conducting market research, economic analysis, and other practical applications.

North Korea 
Chovanec is one of just over a thousand U.S. citizens to have been permitted to visit North Korea. His first visit, in October 2008, took him to Pyongyang, Myohyang-san, and the northern side of the Korean Demilitarized Zone. His second trip, in July 2010, took him to the Rajin-Sonbong Economic Special Zone, in the country's extreme northeast, and across the Khasan railroad border crossing with Russia. Chovanec has been interviewed about both trips and has written detailed accounts of his experiences on his blog.

References

External links 
 Chovanec's official blog
 Patrick Chovanec on Twitter
 Patrick Chovanec's author page on Seeking Alpha
 The Beijing Consensus: Fact or Fallacy Speech by Patrick Chovanec at the Woodrow Wilson International Center for Scholars, June 30, 2011

1970 births
Living people
People from Chicago
Illinois Republicans
American economics writers
American male non-fiction writers
Economists from Illinois
International finance economists
Macroeconomists
American foreign policy writers
American bloggers
American people of Slovak descent
Princeton University alumni
St. Ignatius College Prep alumni
Wharton School of the University of Pennsylvania alumni
Academic staff of Tsinghua University
Private equity and venture capital investors
American expatriate academics
American expatriates in China
21st-century American non-fiction writers
21st-century American economists
American male bloggers